Mafalda Rodiles Soares Correia Pinto (born 10 February 1983) is a Portuguese actress and model.

Career 
She played one of the main characters - Carlota Antunes - in the second season of the teen hit series "Morangos com Açúcar" (2004/05), where she became popular.
Later, she was one of the hosts of the talk-show "6Teen" (2005/06). 
She has continued to integrate other soap opera casts, such as "Tempo de Viver" (2006), "Floribella" (2006), "Ilha dos Amores" (2007) and "Casos da Vida" (2008).

External links
 

1983 births
Living people
Actresses from Lisbon
Portuguese television actresses
Portuguese female models